Wu Fei (born 2 July 1989) is a Chinese footballer who currently plays for Wuhan Three Towns in the Chinese Super League as a goalkeeper.

Club career

Wuhan Zall 
Wu Fei, a product of Hubei youth academy, started his professional career in 2009 at Hubei Greenery, a third tier Chinese football club. On September 5, 2009, he made his debut for the team in a league game that ended in a 1–0 win over Ningbo Hua'ao. He would go on to gain promotion with the club at the end of the season as the club finished runners-up at the end of the campaign. He would play understudy to Wu Yan and then Zhu Zisen as he spent most of his time on the bench during his five years spell at the club.

Jiangxi Liansheng 
Following Wuhan Zall's relegation from China Super League in 2013, he joined Jiangxi Liansheng along with his teammates Xin Feng, Ao Feifan and Li Gang. In 2014, he played a crucial part in Jiangxi Liansheng's promotion to China League One. The following season with the club was not a success and the team were immediately relegated at the end of the campaign. In 2016, Wu lost his position to Wen Zhixiang and made only 2 appearances.

Shenzhen Ledman F.C. 
In 2017 he joined another China League Two side Shenzhen Ledman F.C. and become the regular goalkeeper for the team in China League Two. His contract was terminated after the end of 2018 season as Shenzhen Ledman became defunct.

Wuhan Three Towns F.C. 
On February 15, 2019, Wu Fei signed for China League Two side Wuhan Three Towns on a free transfer. He would immediately establish himself as their first choice goalkeeper and in the following season he would aid them in winning the league division. The following season he would fight for the goalkeeping position with on loan goalkeeper Geng Xiaofeng and be part of the squad that won the second tier title within the 2021 China League One campaign. With the club in the top tier for the first time they would bring in experienced Chinese international goalkeeper Liu Dianzuo as their first choice goalkeeper, however Wu would go on to make his Chinese Super League debut on 17 August 2022 against Henan Songshan Longmen in a 3–0 victory. Throughout the season he would be part of the squad that won the 2022 Chinese Super League title.

Career statistics 
Statistics accurate as of match played 11 January 2023.

Honours

Club
Jiangxi Liansheng
China League Two: 2014
Wuhan Three Towns
Chinese Super League: 2022.
China League One: 2021
China League Two: 2020

References

External links
 

1989 births
Footballers from Hubei
Living people
Association football goalkeepers
Wuhan F.C. players
Jiangxi Beidamen F.C. players
Chinese Super League players
China League One players
Chinese footballers